Palominas is a census-designated place located along the San Pedro River in the southern portion of Cochise County in the state of Arizona, United States.  Palominas is located very close to the community of Miracle Valley along Arizona State Highway 92.  The population of Palominas as of the 2020 U.S. Census was 222.

Demographics

Transportation 
Cochice Connection provides bus connections between Douglas, Bisbee, and Sierra Vista, with a stop in Palominas.

Gallery

Notes

References 

Census-designated places in Cochise County, Arizona